Calystegia affinis is a critically endangered species of climbing or creeping vine in the plant family Convolvulaceae. It is endemic to Lord Howe Island and Norfolk Island.  In 2003 only about 45 mature plants were known, with about 40 of those on Norfolk Island.

Etymology
The genus name, Calystegia is derived from the Greek:  kalux, "cup", and stegos, "a covering", meaning "a covering cup" and refers to the bracteoles enclosing the calyx. The specific epithet, affinis, is Latin for 'neighbouring', which was possibly chosen by Endlicher on the basis of his comment that the species was closely allied to Calystegia marginata.

Description
Calystegia affinis is a thin-stemmed plant in the genus Calystegia which climbs by twining. It has sparse alternate, arrow-headed leaves about 6 cm x 5 cm. The flowers are axillary, solitary, pink with five cream longitudinal bands and are funnel-shaped. They have large persistent bracteoles enclosing the calyx which has five sepals and five petals. The fruit is a papery capsule which splits longitudinally into four valves. The plant is thought to reproduce both clonally and by seed.

Taxonomy
Calystegia affinis was first described by Endlicher in 1833. In 1904, Joseph Maiden renamed it Convolvulus affinis, but this is considered an illegal name by the Commonwealth Heads of Australian Herbaria. The other synonyms (given above) are illegal names, misapplications or pro-parte misapplications, with the species concept having been refined by P.S. Green in 1994 in Flora of Australia.

References

affinis
Flora of Lord Howe Island
Flora of Norfolk Island